State Route 187 (SR 187) is a  state highway in the south-central part of the U.S. state of Georgia. It connects Mayday to Homerville.

Route description
SR 187 begins in Echols County in Mayday at an intersection with US 129/SR 11. This is the only major junction in the county. The road enters Clinch County southwest of Homerville. In town, SR 187 meets its eastern terminus, an intersection with US 441/SR 89.

Major intersections

See also

References

187
Transportation in Clinch County, Georgia
Transportation in Echols County, Georgia